is a Japanese former cyclist. He competed in the individual and team pursuit events at the 1976 Summer Olympics and 1974 Asian Games. He was mostly known in Japan as a professional keirin cyclist.

References

External links
 

1954 births
Living people
Japanese male cyclists
Olympic cyclists of Japan
Cyclists at the 1976 Summer Olympics
Sportspeople from Fukushima Prefecture
Keirin cyclists
Asian Games medalists in cycling
Cyclists at the 1974 Asian Games
Medalists at the 1974 Asian Games
Asian Games gold medalists for Japan